Colin Farrell is an Irish actor. He first appeared in the BBC drama series Ballykissangel (1998) before making his film debut in the drama film The War Zone (1999). He broke out into Hollywood as the lead in Tigerland (2000). He would go on to star in Phone Booth (2002), S.W.A.T., and The Recruit (both 2003), establishing himself as a box office draw. Additionally, he also appeared in Steven Spielberg's sci-fi thriller Minority Report (2002) and as the supervillain Bullseye in the film Daredevil (2003). His role in the black comedy film In Bruges (2008) earned him the Golden Globe Award for Best Actor – Motion Picture Musical or Comedy. Other notable film roles include The Imaginarium of Doctor Parnassus (2009), Fright Night (2011), Total Recall, Saving Mr. Banks (2013), The Lobster (2015), Fantastic Beasts and Where to Find Them (2016), The Batman (2022) and Thirteen Lives (2022). For his role in The Banshees of Inisherin (2022), Farrell won the Volpi Cup for Best Actor at the Venice International Film Festival, and was nominated for the Academy Award for Best Actor.

On television, he starred in the second season of HBO's True Detective, and starred in the BBC miniseries The North Water.

Film

Television

References

External links
 

Male actor filmographies
British filmographies
Irish filmographies